The Headies Award for Best Pop Single is an award presented at The Headies, a ceremony that was established in 2006 and originally called the Hip Hop World Awards. It was first presented to Dr SID's single Pop Something in 2011.

Recipients

References 

The Headies